Atil (also Átil) is a small town in Atil Municipality in the northwest of the Mexican state of Sonora.  The total area is 400.43 km² and the population of the municipality was 734 in 2005, of whom 699 lived in the municipal seat (2000).  Neighboring municipalities are Tubutama, Trincheras, Oquitoa, and Altar.

It was founded in 1751 by the Jesuit missionary Jacobo Sedelmayer as a mission with the name of Atil.  The first inhabitants were Pima Alto or Nebome Indians, who before conversion had led a nomadic or semi-nomadic life.

Atil is one of the smallest municipalities in the state.  It is said that its name means 
"Arrow Point", in the Pima language.

The terrain is desert and mostly flat.  Summer temperatures average 25.6 °C but daytime extremes are frequently above 40 °C.  The winter average is 12.8 °C.

There is one tarmacked road crossing the municipality linking Altar with Tubutama.  There are several dirt roads crossing the desert.

The economy is based on agriculture with lands irrigated by the Cuautémoc Reservoir located in the north of the municipality.  There is also cattle raising.

References

Other sources
Enciclopedia de los Municipios de Mexico
Instituto Nacional de Estadística, Geografia, e Informática (INEGI)

External links
Atil, Ayuntamiento Digital (Official WebSite of Atil, Sonora)

See also
Santa Teresa de Atil

Populated places in Sonora
Populated places in the Sonoran Desert of Mexico
Populated places established in 1751
1751 establishments in New Spain